Parkdean Resorts is a holiday park operator in the United Kingdom. It was formed in November 2015 through the merger of Parkdean Holidays and Park Resorts. As of 2022 it operates 66 holiday parks across England, Scotland, and Wales, and is the largest holiday park operator in the UK. Parkdean invested £140 million into its parks in the UK in 2021 and 2022.

John Waterworth was CEO of Parkdean Holidays and Parkdean Resorts for nearly 20 years before retiring in June 2019. Steve Richards is currently the CEO.

History

Parkdean Holidays
Parkdean Holidays was formed in November 1999 via a management buyout of Trecco Bay Holiday Park in Porthcawl, South Wales. In March 2006, Alchemy Partners purchased an 80% stake in the company, with the remaining 20% split between Parkdean Holidays' management. In July 2007 Parkdean Holidays bought Weststar Holidays, which owned four holiday parks in South West England. The company offered a range of accommodation, including caravan holiday homes, lodges, cottages, and apartments; it also had caravan and camping pitches at many locations.

Park Resorts
Park Resorts was created in May 2001 when Close Brothers Private Equity (CBPE), in partnership with a management-buyout team led by David Vaughan, purchased 12 Haven Holidays freehold caravan parks from Bourne Leisure. This created the UK's second largest caravan park group; Vaughan, former managing director of Rank Leisure and Rank Entertainment, became the company's CEO. Holiday parks were mainly located at or near to the seaside or lakeside, chiefly on the south and east coasts of England, . Income was generated from rentals of static holiday caravans and touring pitches, alongside caravan and holiday home sales and on-site retail.

In late December 2004, the firm was sold by its private-equity holder CBPE to ABN Amro Private Equity, and merged with GB Holiday Parks. In March 2007, ABN Amro sold the company to GI Partners for £440 million in a highly leveraged buyout. The same year, the three founding directors left the business and Martin Grant joined from Roadchef as CEO. In December 2008, in increasingly difficult financial conditions, GI Partners reinstated the original three directors, with David Vaughan returning as CEO. In September 2009, former CEO Martin Grant, Colin Bramhall and Richard Hunt won a case of unfair dismissal against GI Partners and were awarded £45,000 in compensation, but the tribunal rejected the men's allegation that GI Partners had lied to Park Resorts' lenders.

In October 2009, a restructuring of Park Resorts' £325 million debt facilities was agreed upon by its creditor banks; this included a new £25 million debt facility to fund a programme investing in the company's parks over the next five years;   the banks took a 5% stake in the company. In July 2013 Electra Partners became the new majority shareholder and they appointed a new CEO, David Boden, who had held senior board level positions at The Rank Group and Hippodrome Casinos Ltd. Park Resorts' founder and CEO David Vaughan became the company's chairman. The new lead shareholders also refinanced Park Resorts' debt package, with Electra Partners gaining a 54% stake in the company; the restructuring freed up significant capital to invest in the company's parks. In August 2014, in partnership with Park Resorts, Electra Partners acquired the company Eastern Parks, owner of Southview Holiday Park in Skegness and Manor Park Holiday Park in Hunstanton, from Bluebird Partners. Park Resorts had been managing both parks since 2010. In November 2014, Alan Parker, chairman of Mothercare and former CEO of Whitbread, was appointed chairman of Park Resorts.

2015-current
In 2015, Parkdean Holidays merged with Park Resorts to create Parkdean Resorts. The new company continued to operate under its two brands, "Parkdean Holidays" and "Park Resorts", with dual head offices in Newcastle and Hemel Hempstead, throughout 2016 before launching a new website and rebranding all the parks as Parkdean Resorts.

In December 2016, Canadian private equity company Onex Corporation purchased Parkdean Resorts from Epiris (formerly Electra Partners) and Alchemy Partners for £1.35 billion. The sale was completed in March 2017, and Onex Partners and certain co-investors made an equity investment of $627 million in the newly acquired company.

In June 2019 John Waterworth, who had been the CEO of Parkdean Holidays and then Parkdean Resorts for nearly 20 years, retired. Steve Richards, then CEO of Casual Dining Group, became CEO of Parkdean Resorts.

As of early 2020, Parkdean Resorts had 20,000 owners of on-site private caravans and lodges, and in its previous peak season of August 2019 had 120,000 people staying at its parks attended by 8,000 employees.

During the COVID-19 pandemic in the United Kingdom, Parkdean was criticized for not shutting down its travel parks during a time when the government was advising citizens to avoid non-essential travel. On 20 March 2020, Parkdean shut down all restaurants, pools, and other facilities in response to a nationwide Government order.

At the time, Parkdean stated to the press that the caravans are standalone and separate from each other with 70% privately owned, saying there is "no instruction or logic to evicting people who are enjoying the fresh air in their own space." People in multiple locations concerned that the parks staying open would place pressure on sparsely populated areas that are already struggling to obtain food supplies and that it would further spread the virus from metropolitan areas to remote rural areas that were poorly equipped to deal with it. On 23 March 2020, when the UK government announced a nationwide lockdown, the company closed its parks to the public, and announced plans to re-open to the public on 6 July.

In 2021 and 2022, Parkdean announced a number of park investments, for a total of £140 million. The investment plan included "850 new caravans and lodges," and developments at 16 parks. At the time, Parkdean said advance bookings were at "record levels" and that it was recruiting over 7,000 seasonal workers.

In the spring of 2021, Parkdean announced it would hire 6,500 seasonal staff for the summer. In early 2022, 13 different parks underwent some form of development, with Parkdean continuing to partner with brands such as Bear Grylls’ Survival Academy, ''Milkshake! and Nickelodeon. With its head office in Gosforth, Newcastle, Parkdean has 66 parks and a reported 3 million visitors per year. The company's holiday resorts include caravans, lodges, cabins, glamping and camping over 3,500 acres of land and 31,000 camping pitches.

Holiday parks and resorts 
There are, as of 2022, 66 Parkdean Resorts located across the United Kingdom.

Current holiday parks and resorts 
 Cornwall: Crantock Beach, Holywell Bay, Looe Bay, Newquay, St Minver, White Acres, Lizard Point, Sea Acres 
 Devon: Bideford Bay, Challaborough Bay, Ruda, Torquay
 Dorset: Sandford, Warmwell, West Bay
 East Sussex: Camber Sands
 East Riding of Yorkshire: Barmston Beach, Skipsea Sands, Withernsea Sands
 Essex: Coopers Beach, Highfield Grange, Naze Marine, Weeley Bridge, Valley Farm
 Isle of Wight: Landguard, Lower Hyde, Nodes Point, Thorness Bay
 Kent: Romney Sands, St Margarets Bay
 Lancashire: Regent Bay, Ocean Edge, Todber Valley
 Lincolnshire: Sunnydale, Southview
 Norfolk: Breydon Water, California Cliffs, Cherry Tree, Heacham Beach, Manor Park, Summerfields, Vauxhall
 Northumberland and County Durham: Crimdon Dene, Whitley Bay, Sandy Bay, Creswell Towers, Church Point
 North Yorkshire: Cayton Bay
 Suffolk: Kessingland Beach
 Scotland: Eyemouth, Grannies Heilan Hame, Nairn Lochloy, Sandylands, Southerness, Sundrum Castle, Tummel Valley, Wemyss Bay
 Wales: Brynowen, Carmarthen Bay, Pendine Sands, Trecco Bay, Ty Mawr

Logos

References

Companies based in Newcastle upon Tyne
2015 establishments in England
British companies established in 2015
Hospitality companies of Europe
Holiday camps